October 30 - Eastern Orthodox liturgical calendar - November 1

All fixed commemorations below are observed on November 13 by Eastern Orthodox Churches on the Old Calendar.

For October 31st, Orthodox Churches on the Old Calendar commemorate the Saints listed on October 18.

Saints
 Apostles of the Seventy: Stachys, Amplias, Urban, Narcissus, Apelles and Aristobulus (1st century)
 Martyr Epimachus of Pelusium, at Alexandria (c. 250)
 Saint Maura of Constantinople (436)
 Martyrs Epimachus the Roman and his companion Gordianos (361-363)  (see also: May 9)
 Saint Jacob of Nisibis the Worderworker, Bishop of Antiochia Mygdoniae (4th century)
 Martyrs Seleucius and Stratonica his wife, myrrh-gushers.
 Martyrs Stephen, Barnabas, Trophimus, Dorymedon, Cosmas, Damian, Sabbas, Bassa, Abramios, and others with them.  (see also: September 19)
 The Holy Twelve Daughters.
 The Holy Three Martyrs of Melitene.
 The Holy Child Martyr.

Pre-Schism Western saints
 Saint Quentin (Quinctinus), martyr.
 Saint Erth (Erc of Slane, Herygh, Urith) (6th century)  (see also: November 2)
 Monk-martyr Foillan, Irish missionary, of Burgh Castle (East Anglia) and Fosse (Gaul) (655)
 Saint Antoninus, called Fontana, Archbishop of Milan, Confessor (660)
 Saint Begu, a nun at Hackness in Yorkshire in England (c. 660)
 Saint Notburga, a nun at the convent of St Mary in the Capitol in Cologne in Germany (c. 714)
 Saint Arnulf, a monk at Novalese in Piedmont in Italy, martyred by the Saracens (c. 840)
 Saint Wolfgang of Regensburg, Bishop of Regensburg (994)

Post-Schism Orthodox saints
 Venerable Spyridon and Nicodemus the Prosphora-bakers, of the Kiev Caves (1148)
 Saint Anatolius, recluse of the Near Caves in Kiev (12th century)
 100,000 Martyrs of Tbilisi slain under Jalal al-Din (1227)
 New Martyr Nicholas of Chios (1754)
 Righteous Petro Kalnyshevsky, Koshevoy-Commander of the Zaporozhian Cossacks (1803)

New martyrs and confessors
 New Hieromartyr John Kochurov, Archpriest, of Chicago and St. Petersburg, First Hieromartyr of the Bolshevik Yoke (1917)
 New Hieromartyr Leonid (Molchanov), Abbot of the Sovlvychegodsk Monastery, Vologda (1918)
 New Hieromartyrs (1937):
 Sergius, Archbishop of Yeletsky.
 Vsevolod Smirnov, Protopresbyter, of Moscow.
 Alexis Sibersky of Tver, and of Moscow, priest.
 Alexander Vozdvizhensky and Sergius Rozanov, priests.
 Basil Archangelsky, priest.
 Euphrosynus (Antonov), Hieromonk of the Seven Lakes Monastery, Kazan. 
 Anatole (Botvinnikov), Hieromonk, of Dubrovskoye, Tver.
 New Martyr Jacob Blatov (1937)
 New Hieromartyr Innocent (Mazurin), Hierodeacon, of Buygorod, Volokolamsk (1938)

Other commemorations
 Commemoration of an Anonymous Apologist, under Julian the Apostate (c. 361)
 Consecration of the Patriarchal Prayer Chapel.
 Martyrdom of José Muñoz Cortés, keeper of the "Montreal" copy of the Panagia Portaitissa icon, in Athens (1997)

Icon gallery

Notes

References

Sources
 October 31/November 13. Orthodox Calendar (PRAVOSLAVIE.RU).
 November 13 / October 31. HOLY TRINITY RUSSIAN ORTHODOX CHURCH (A parish of the Patriarchate of Moscow).
 October 31. OCA - The Lives of the Saints.
 The Autonomous Orthodox Metropolia of Western Europe and the Americas (ROCOR). St. Hilarion Calendar of Saints for the year of our Lord 2004. St. Hilarion Press (Austin, TX). p. 81.
 The Thirty-First Day of the Month of October. Orthodoxy in China.
 October 31. Latin Saints of the Orthodox Patriarchate of Rome.
 The Roman Martyrology. Transl. by the Archbishop of Baltimore. Last Edition, According to the Copy Printed at Rome in 1914. Revised Edition, with the Imprimatur of His Eminence Cardinal Gibbons. Baltimore: John Murphy Company, 1916. p. 335-336.
 Rev. Richard Stanton. A Menology of England and Wales, or, Brief Memorials of the Ancient British and English Saints Arranged According to the Calendar, Together with the Martyrs of the 16th and 17th Centuries. London: Burns & Oates, 1892. pp. 519–520.
Greek Sources
 Great Synaxaristes:  31 ΟΚΤΩΒΡΙΟΥ. ΜΕΓΑΣ ΣΥΝΑΞΑΡΙΣΤΗΣ.
  Συναξαριστής. 31 Οκτωβρίου. ECCLESIA.GR. (H ΕΚΚΛΗΣΙΑ ΤΗΣ ΕΛΛΑΔΟΣ).
  31/10/2015. Ορθόδοξος Συναξαριστής. 
Russian Sources
  13 ноября (31 октября). Православная Энциклопедия под редакцией Патриарха Московского и всея Руси Кирилла (электронная версия). (Orthodox Encyclopedia - Pravenc.ru).
  31 октября по старому стилю / 13 ноября по новому стилю. Русская Православная Церковь - Православный церковный календарь на 2018 год.

October in the Eastern Orthodox calendar